Joo Dai-min or Dai Min Joo (born 21 January 1988) is a South Korean professional footballer. He currently plays in Thailandfor Nongbua Pitchaya, and has played in the Thai Premier League and the Thai Division 1 League.

References

1988 births
Living people
South Korean footballers
Joo Dai-min
Joo Dai-min
South Korean expatriate footballers
South Korean expatriate sportspeople in Thailand
Expatriate footballers in Thailand
Association football defenders